Echinacea simulata, commonly called wavy leaf purple coneflower, glade coneflower, or prairie purple coneflower, is a species of perennial flowering plant in the family Asteraceae. It is native to the east-central states of the United States.  Its natural habitat is dry, calcareous, open areas such as barrens and woodlands.

Description
Echinacea simulata is very similar in appearances to E. pallida, which has a different chromosome number. The most readily distinguishing morphological feature is that E. simulata has yellow pollen grains. More work is needed to determine the physical and ecological differences between these two taxa.

The foliage and stems have spreading hairs that are sparsely to densely distributed. The stems are mostly green or purple mottled. The plant has both basal leaves and leaves along the stem. They usually have 3 primary veins.

Ray corollas are normally soft rose to pink colored but also rarely off white.

Distribution and habitat
E. simulata is native to the east-central states of Arkansas, Georgia, Kansas, Missouri and Tennessee. The plant is rare in Alabama, Georgia, and Tennessee. It is reported as introduced in Illinois. The U.S. Department of Agriculture also reports it as native to North Carolina and Virginia. Wavy leaf purple coneflower has a relatively small distribution, and its locations are still being determined. 

The plant grows in glades and open woodlands and prefers dry, calcareous soils.

Ecology
This species blooms in late spring to midsummer. Butterflies and bees are attracted to the nectar and birds eat the seeds in the late summer and fall.

References

simulata
Flora of the Eastern United States
Plants described in 1967